The Samsung Securities Cup was a professional tennis tournament played on outdoor hard courts. It was part of the Association of Tennis Professionals (ATP) Challenger Tour and the ITF Women's Circuit. The men's event was held annually in Seoul, South Korea, from 2000 to 2013, the women's event parallel from 2011 to 2013.

Past finals

Men's singles

Women's singles

Men's doubles

Women's doubles 

 
ATP Challenger Tour
ITF Women's World Tennis Tour
Samsung Sports
Sport in Seoul
Hard court tennis tournaments
Tennis tournaments in South Korea
Recurring sporting events established in 2000
Recurring sporting events disestablished in 2013